Several ships have been named Mariner:

 was launched at Whitehaven. In 1814 an American privateer captured her but the British Royal Navy recaptured her. On 23 August 1823 her crew abandoned Mariner, which then foundered in the Atlantic.
 was launched at Whitby and registered in London. Her notability comes from her having made three voyages transporting convicts to New South Wales between 1816 and 1827. She continued trading until 1857.
 was launched at Philadelphia. The British seized her for trading with the French and she became a British merchantman. She was wrecked in July 1823.

See also
 – one of five ships of the Royal Navy
 – one of two ships of the United States Navy

Ship names